The Kalinago genocide was the massacre of an estimated 2,000 Kalinago people by English and French settlers on the island of Saint Kitts in 1626.

Event 
In the early 17th century, the Kalinago leader Tegremond had become uneasy with the increasing number of English and French settlers emigrating to the island of Saint Kitts. The settlers soon outnumbered the Kalinago and began to clear land around the island to establish farms. In 1626, Tegremond began plotting to massacre all English and French settlers on Saint Kitts, under the fear that they would "completely take over the island"; he secretly dispatched messengers to Kalinago communities on other West Indian islands, informing them to come to Saint Kitts by canoe at night for the planned attack on the settlers. However, a Kalinago woman named Barbe informed Thomas Warner and Pierre Belain d'Esnambuc of Tegremond's plan; taking pre-emptive action, the settlers invited the Kalinago to a party where they became intoxicated. When the Kalinago returned to their village, the settlers attacked them and 120 Kalinago were killed in the attack, including Tegremond. The following day, roughly 4,000 Kalinago were forced by the settlers into the area of Bloody Point and Bloody River where a battle broke out; historian Vincent K. Hubbard estimates 2,000 Kalinago were massacred while attempting to surrender. The account of the massacre by Jean-Baptiste Du Tertre described "piles of [Kalinago] bodies" after the massacre. 100 settlers were also killed in the battle, with one French settler going insane after being struck by a poisoned arrow from a Kalinago before dying. The remaining Kalinago fled into the mountains, and by 1640, those who were not enslaved were forcibly removed to Dominica.

References 

Carib people
Genocides in North America
Genocide of indigenous peoples of North America
Massacres of indigenous North Americans
Saint Kitts (island)
Wars involving Saint Kitts and Nevis
Conflicts in 1626
1626 in North America
1620s in the Caribbean
History of British Saint Christopher and Nevis
Kalinago
Ethnic cleansing in North America
Events in the Caribbean
Massacres committed by England
Massacres committed by France